Alectryon macrococcus, known as Alaalahua or Māhoe in Hawaiian, is a species of flowering tree in the soapberry family, Sapindaceae, that is endemic to Hawaii.

It is threatened by habitat loss.

Their leaves are each made up of oval-shaped, asymmetrical, net-veined leaflets. Variety auwahiensis has leaflets with rusty-red undersides. The fruits contain a seed with a bright red aril. The arils are sweet-tasting and were food for native Hawaiians. The seeds also attract rats, whose consumption of them prevents the plants of this endangered species from reproducing. The black twig borer (Xylosandrus compactus) destroys the twigs.

References

External links

macrococcus
Plants described in 1890
Endemic flora of Hawaii
Trees of Hawaii
Critically endangered plants
Taxonomy articles created by Polbot